Ophiderpeton (from  , 'snake' and   'creeper') is an extinct genus of aistopod tetrapodomorphs from the early Carboniferous to the early Permian. Remains of this genus are widespread and were found in Ohio, United States, Ireland, and the Czech Republic (Central Europe).

Like other aistopods, Ophiderpeton was snake-like, without any trace of limbs. The skull measured , and large, forward-facing eyes, suggesting a hunting lifestyle. It probably lived in burrows, feeding on insects, worms, millipedes, and snails.

Many species are classified in the genus, and similar animals, Phlegethontia and Sillerpeton, are known. An earlier genus, Lethiscus, is known from the Carboniferous and Early Permian.

References

External links
Ophiderpeton at Palaeos.com.

Aistopods
Carboniferous fish of North America
Carboniferous fish of Europe
Permian fish of North America
Permian fish of Europe
Fossil taxa described in 1866
Taxa named by Thomas Henry Huxley